Hynhamia bahiana is a species of moth of the family Tortricidae. It is found in Bahia, Brazil.

The wingspan is about 16 mm. The ground colour of the forewings is cream, suffused with brownish. The markings are brownish. The hindwings are cream, slightly mixed with yellowish-brown at the apex.

Etymology
The specific name refers to the state Bahia, where the species is from.

References

Moths described in 2011
Hynhamia